Culpeper or Culpepper may refer to:


People
 Culpeper (surname), a list of people with the surname Culpeper, Culpepper or Colepeper

Places
 Culpeper, Virginia, United States, a town
 Culpeper station, a railroad station
 Culpeper Historic District
 Culpeper County, Virginia, United States
 Culpeper National Cemetery
 Culpeper Regional Airport
 Culpeper Basin, New Jersey, United States
 Culpepper Island, a small uninhabited isle off the coast of Barbados, West Indies
 Culpepper Island (Galápagos), other name of Darwin Island in the Galapagos, Ecuador

Other uses 
 Culpepper (horse), an American Thoroughbred racehorse, winner of the 1874 Preakness Stakes
 Culpeper baronets, two extinct titles in the Baronetage of England

See also
 Culpeper's Rebellion